Self-Portrait is a c.1669 self-portrait by the Dutch artist Rembrandt, now in the Uffizi in Florence.

Sources
http://www.bildindex.de/dokumente/html/obj20155044

Paintings in the collection of the Uffizi
Florence
1669 paintings